The E.G. Ellis House is a historic house in Hamilton, Montana. It was built in 1900 for Sidney A. Wheeler, an immigrant from Canada. Wheeler was a farmer who owned a slaughterhouse. He was a member of the Hamilton Masonic Lodge, and he died in 1947.

The house was designed in the Colonial Revival and Queen Anne architectural styles. It has been listed on the National Register of Historic Places since August 26, 1988.

References

National Register of Historic Places in Ravalli County, Montana
Queen Anne architecture in Montana
Colonial Revival architecture in Montana
Houses completed in 1900
1900 establishments in Montana
Hamilton, Montana
Houses in Ravalli County, Montana
Houses on the National Register of Historic Places in Montana